Dhoda may refer to:
 Dhoda, Kohat, a village and union council in Khyber Pakhtunkhwa, Pakistan
 Dhoda, Chakwal, a village in Chakwal District, Punjab, Pakistan
 Dhoda, Ludhiana, a village in Punjab, India
 Tahta, known in Coptic as Dhoda, a city in Egypt

See also 
 Dhodha, a Hindu festival
 Doda (disambiguation)